Fresh 40 was a networked dance and urban music singles chart show broadcast on a number of UK commercial radio stations every Sunday from 4pm to 7pm. The show was produced by Somethin' Else. The radio show was launched on Sunday 22 October 2006, and counts down the top 40 R'n'B and dance songs in the chart. Schedule-wise, the programme competes against BBC Radio 1's official chart show. It is also broadcast at the same time as its sister show, hit40uk (which was rebranded The Big Top 40 Show on 15 June 2009).

The last show is thought to have been Sunday, 1 March 2009 with Justin Wilkes as their website www.fresh40.co.uk now has a holding page for Somethin' Else and Kiss 100 announced a new schedule for Sunday on Wednesday 4 March 2009.

The show, hosted by Dynamite MC, was broadcast on some of commercial radio's dance and urban stations such as the Kiss Network, Galaxy Network, Oxford's FM 107.9, Fire 107.6 and 107.6 Juice FM. Amongst the features in the show is what was branded as The Top 10 Throwdown, consisting of the Top 10 played out 'in-the-mix' and commercial-free. The Top 10 Throwdown was mixed by DJ Fidget Kid. Fresh 40 was sponsored by UK national drugs advice group FRANK.

The Kiss Network now have a show on at this time called "Official Kiss Top 40". This show counts down the 40 most wanted and most played songs on the Kiss Network, hosted by Justin Wilkes.

External links
 Fresh 40 website
 Talk to FRANK website
 Kiss website
 Galaxy FM website
 Fire 107.6 FM Bournemouth website
 Juice FM 107.6 Liverpool website
 Oxford's FM107.9 website
 Dynamite MC's official myspace page
 Somethin' Else Fresh 40 production company.
 RadioFeeds contains a list and map of stations airing the Fresh 40 show.

GCap Media
British music radio programmes
British record charts
Music chart shows